The men's sanda 56 kilograms competition at the 2014 Asian Games in Incheon, South Korea was held from 20 September to 24 September at the Ganghwa Dolmens Gymnasium.

A total of fourteen competitors from fourteen different countries competed in this event, limited to fighters whose body weight was less than 56 kilograms.

Zhao Fuxiang from China won the gold medal after beating Bùi Trường Giang of Vietnam in gold medal bout 2–0, Zhao won both periods by the same score of 5–0. The bronze medal was shared by Francisco Solis from the Philippines and Khamla Soukaphone of Laos. Charygylych Tagangylyjov from Turkmenistan, Railin Rizaidin from Kazakhstan, Wong Ting Hong from Hong Kong and Kyaw Kyaw from Myanmar shared the fifth place.

Athletes from Iran, Pakistan, Malaysia, India, Mongolia and Nepal lost in the first round and didn't advance.

Schedule
All times are Korea Standard Time (UTC+09:00)

Results
Legend
WO — Won by walkover

References

External links
Official website

Men's sanda 56 kg